The Division of Whitlam is an Australian electoral division in the state of New South Wales.

Whitlam is an industrial and working-class electorate. It includes the cities of Wollongong and Shellharbor. Whitlam covers 1,331 square kilometers in the southern Illawarra and NSW southern highlands. Whitlam has voted Labor since its inception, although it has started to slowly give small swings to the Liberal Party.

The current MP is Stephen Jones, a member of the Australian Labor Party. Jones was born in Wollongong and was a union official before being elected to Parliament in 2016.

Geography
Federal electoral division boundaries in Australia are determined at redistributions by a redistribution committee appointed by the Australian Electoral Commission. Redistributions occur for the boundaries of divisions in a particular state, and they occur every seven years, or sooner if a state's representation entitlement changes or when divisions of a state are malapportioned.

History

The division, previously named Throsby, was renamed in honour of Gough Whitlam, the Prime Minister of Australia from 1972–75, in a February 2016 electoral distribution.  It came into effect from 2 July 2016, the date of the 2016 Australian federal election.

ABC election analyst Antony Green estimated that boundary changes to Throsby would reduce the Australian Labor Party's notional two-party-preferred margin from 7.8 to 6.9 percentage points. Despite this, the last member for Throsby, Stephen Jones, easily retained the seat with a healthy swing of over six points.

Whitlam has a strong working-class character due to the presence of industries such as steelmaking, coal mining and stevedoring. The Illawarra is one of the few non-metropolitan regions where Labor consistently does well.

Members

Election results

References

External links
AEC: Profile of the electoral division of Whitlam (NSW)

Electoral divisions of Australia
Constituencies established in 2016
2016 establishments in Australia
Gough Whitlam